BASH! (which originally stood for "Basic Action Super Heroes") is a popular superhero role-playing game written by Chris Rutkowsky and published by Basic Action Games. The game system is designed to allow players to create virtually any type of hero or villain desired.

History
BASH! was published in 2005.  It uses its own fictional setting, once known as "Megapolis."

A high fantasy game and a science fiction game have also been released using the BASH! rules set.

A second edition of BASH! called BASH! Ultimate Edition debuted at RPGnow.com on Black Friday of 2009.

Character creation
BASH! does not use character classes, instead using "Character Scale," "Character Points" and "Campaign Scale" (suggested by the "Narrator" or gamemaster) as guidelines for character creation. This allows a character to begin as an already established superhero with incredible abilities.

Character Scale suggests the level of power available to the player characters, relative to "normal" people. Are these teenage heroes just coming to grips with their powers, or are they cosmic entities trying to save an entire galaxy? The degree of power that individual heroes have is represented by Character Points, and these points are used by the players to create their characters.  The number of Character Points is dictated by the Campaign Scale.

Advancement
In BASH!, characters are awarded additional Character Points upon achievement of goals and completion of adventures.

Hero Points
BASH! uses "Hero Points". Hero Points allow a player to fudge a botched die roll, and reduces the role of luck in gameplay.

Setting
The core BASH! Ultimate Edition book does not come with a default setting.

Settings published for the game include:
Megapolis A four-color city setting by Chris Rutkowsky that includes elements similar to the icons and concepts of classic comic books.

Reviews
BASH! Ultimate Edition was nominated for a 2010 ENnie award in the "Best Rules" category.

References

External links
 
 BASH! Ultimate Forum the official BASH! fan discussion boards
  ENies 2010 nominations.

Superhero role-playing games
Role-playing games introduced in 2005